CIQ may refer to:

 Ctrl IQ, a next-gen software infrastructure company built on Rocky Linux
 Capital IQ, a financial information provider
 Customer Information Questionnaire, a form by telecommunication equipment manufacturers used to create parameters for 3G NodeBs, 4G ENodeBs and 5G gNodeBs for Mobile network operators
 Cultural Industries Quarter, a district in Sheffield, England
 Carrier IQ, a mobile software company
 Customs, Immigration, Quarantine - services at a port or airport
 Border control